Randolph Carter is a recurring fictional character in H. P. Lovecraft's fiction and is, presumably, an alter ego of Lovecraft himself. The character first appears in "The Statement of Randolph Carter", a short story Lovecraft wrote in 1919 based on one of his dreams. An American magazine called The Vagrant published the story in May 1920.

Carter shares many of Lovecraft's personal traits: He is an uncelebrated author, whose writings are seldom noticed. A melancholy figure, Carter is a quiet contemplative dreamer with a sensitive disposition, prone to fainting during times of emotional stress. But he can also be courageous, with enough strength of mind and character to face and foil the horrific creatures of the Dreamlands, as described in the stories of the Dream Cycle.

Stories
In Lovecraft's writings, Carter appears or is mentioned in the following tales, listed in the fictional chronology.

Character biography 

Randolph Carter is an antiquarian and one-time student of the fictional Miskatonic University. Based on clues from various stories, he was probably born around 1874 and grew up in and around Boston. At the age of nine, he underwent a mysterious experience at his great-uncle Christopher's farm and thereafter exhibited a gift of prophecy.

He is the descendant of Sir Randolph Carter, who had studied magic during the reign of Queen Elizabeth I of England. Sir Randolph had then emigrated to America and his son Edmund Carter later had to flee the Salem witch-trials. Carter also had an ancestor involved in one of the Crusades, who was captured by the Muslims and learned "wild secrets" from them.

Carter served in the French Foreign Legion during the First World War, and was badly wounded in fighting near Belloy-en-Santerre in 1916, presumably during the Battle of the Somme in which the Legion participated. Poet Alan Seeger perished there in the Foreign Legion on the first day of the Somme, and Lovecraft may well have had Seeger in mind; Lovecraft penned a poem to Seeger's memory in 1918.

"The Statement of Randolph Carter" is narrated in flashback by Carter while being interrogated by the police, who suspect him of murdering Harley Warren. Carter and his friend Harley Warren investigate a mysterious crypt in an ancient abandoned cemetery. Warren believes the crypt may contain evidence that could confirm some of his speculations (details of these speculations are never revealed, but it is said that Warren recently read a mysterious book written in an unknown language about incorruptibility of the dead). Upon reaching the cemetery, Carter and Warren uncover the crypt by lifting an immense granite slab, revealing a set of stone steps leading downward into the earth. Warren insists that Carter remain at the surface. He descends the steps alone, but remains in communication with Carter via a portable telephone set. Shortly thereafter he tells Carter that he has discovered a monstrous unbelievable secret and pleads with his companion to replace the stone and run for his life. When Carter asks what he has found, his queries are initially met with silence and then by the voice of an unknown entity who informs him that Warren is dead. The story is almost verbatim from one of Lovecraft's nightmares, with but minor changes like the name "Lovecraft" to "Carter".

"The Unnamable" begins with Carter in conversation with his friend Joel Manton, principal of a New England high school, discussing the supposedly mythical creature that bears the story's name. The tale is set in a 17th-century cemetery as evening falls. Initially, Manton is skeptical and ridicules Carter for thinking that such a being may be possible. As darkness encroaches—and as Carter's descriptions become more detailed and supported by facts—his flippant dismissal gradually gives way to fear. The two are attacked by the monster but survive the experience. "The Unnameable" is notable for containing extensive quoted dialog between the characters, something which Lovecraft scarcely used at all in the rest of his fiction.

There is some question as to whether "The Unnamable's" protagonist is in fact Randolph Carter; he is named only as "Carter" and described as an author of weird fiction. An oblique reference to this incident is found in "The Silver Key".

The Dream-Quest of Unknown Kadath—one of Lovecraft's longest tales—follows Carter for several months searching for the lost city of his dreams. The story reveals Carter's familiarity with much of Lovecraft's fictional universe. Carter is also shown to possess considerable knowledge of the politics and geography of the dream world and has allies there. After an elaborate odyssey, Carter awakens in his Boston apartment with only a fleeting impression of the dream world he left behind, though he now knows what the lost city actually is.

"The Silver Key"—perhaps the most overtly philosophical of Lovecraft's fiction—finds Carter entering middle age and losing his "key to the gate of dreams." No longer is Carter able to escape the mundane realities of life and enter the Lovecraftian dreamworld that alone has given him happiness. Wonder is gone and he has forgotten the fact that life is nothing more than a set of mental images, where there is no fundamental distinction between dreams and reality and no reason to value one above the other. In an attempt to recover his lost innocence, Carter returns to his childhood home and finds a mysterious silver key, which allows him to enter a cave and magically emerge again in the year 1883 as a child, full of wonder, dreams, and happiness. He remains in this condition until 1928, when he again disappears, presumably having found a way to transcend space and time and travel in other dimensions.

"Through the Gates of the Silver Key," written in collaboration with Lovecraft admirer E. Hoffman Price, details Carter's adventures in another dimension where he encounters a more primordial version of himself (implied to be Yog-Sothoth) who explains that Carter—and indeed all beings—are ultimately nothing more than manifestations of a greater being. Carter's mind ends up trapped in the body of an alien, another facet of the higher being. The investigation into Carter's disappearance takes place four years later, in 1932.

"Out of the Aeons" by Lovecraft and Hazel Heald features a brief 1931 appearance by Carter, while trapped in the alien body. He visits a museum exhibiting an ancient mummy from a long-forgotten civilization and recognizes some of the writing on the scroll that accompanies it.

In work by other authors

Literature
Randolph Carter is a prominent character in Lovecraftian: The Shipwright Circle by Steven Philip Jones. The Lovecraftian series reimagines the weird tales of H. P. Lovecraft into one single universe modern epic.
In Thomas Lapperre's book The Uncertainty, Randolph Carter appears as a main character, following up after "Through the Gates of the Silver Key".
Randolph Carter appears in The Clock of Dreams, one of many Cthulhu Mythos novels by Brian Lumley.
In David Haden's Tales of Lovecraftian Cats, Carter's ancestor Sir Randolph Carter is the protagonist in "Beware the Cat". This story is followed by the linked "How the Grimmalkin Came", which also serves as a sequel to Lovecraft's "Through the Gates of the Silver Key".
Gene Wolfe's short story "Game in the Pope's Head" follows a man named Randolph Carter, though his introduction in the book in which the story is published states that it is about Jack the Ripper.
Randolph Carter is the main character in two short stories, both included in the volume Los Espectros Conjurados by Spanish author Alberto López Aroca: "El ojo que repta" ("The Crawling Eye") and "Randolph Carter y el Trono de Ópalo" ("Randolph Carter and the Opal Throne"), which features another of H. P. Lovecraft's characters, Richard Upton Pickman. Carter also makes a cameo appearance in "Los Sabios en Salamanca" ("The Sages in Salamanca"), a short novel by the same author and included in the same volume, starring Professor Challenger and Abraham Van Helsing. Carter also appears (along with Richard Upton Pickman and many other Lovecraft characters) in the novel Necronomicón Z (Dolmen, 2012), set in Arkham and the Dreamlands.
Randolph Carter appears in "Allan and the Sundered Veil", a serialized prose backup in the first six issues of Alan Moore's The League of Extraordinary Gentlemen comic book as well as in "The New Traveller's Almanac". In it, he is stated as being a faculty member of Miskatonic University as well as a relative of Edgar Rice Burroughs' John Carter.
Randolph Carter appears in Cosa Nosferatu, by E.J. Priz, as an old friend of Eliot Ness who involves Ness in an adventure that eventually entangles Ness, Capone, and the Undead. The novel references events in "The Statement of Randolph Carter" and also includes Harley Warren (from that Lovecraft story) as a character, along with references to aspects of the Lovecraft mythos.
Randolph Carter appears in the novel The Weird Company, by Peter Rawlik, in his guise as the Swami Chandraputra. The novel is a sequel to Rawlik's novel Reanimators, itself a companion piece and re-imagining of Lovecraft's Herbert West-Reanimator stories.
Randolph Carter is the King of Ilek-Vad and the former lover of the protagonist in Kij Johnson's The Dream-Quest of Vellitt Boe.
Randolph Carter is the main character of Kye Byllesby's novel The Chronicles of Randolph Carter.
Randolph Carter is referenced in the slang oath "Carter's Cross" in K. M. Alexander's Bell Forging Cycle.

Comics
 Randolph Carter appears in the Caliber ComicsThe Statement of Randolph Carter by Steven Philip Jones and Christopher Jones.
Randolph Carter is portrayed as a member of the Miskatonic Project in the graphic novel, The Miskatonic Project: Bride of Dagon. In the story, it is revealed that Carter is the anonymous narrator of Lovecraft's "The Festival".
 Sara Bardi's webcomic Lovely Lovecraft has Carter serving as the King of Ilek-Vad (as mentioned in Through the Gate of the Silver Key), while young Howard Lovecraft and his mother move into Carter's old house in Arkham. Howard discovers Carter's books and later meets Carter and other familiar characters in the Dreamlands.
In Alan Moore's The Courtyard, Randolph Carter is the name of the frontwoman and vocalist of the band the Ulthar Cats.
In Hans Rodionoff's comic Lovecraft, Randolph Carter is the name Lovecraft uses while traveling in Arkham and battling the Old Ones. He tells his wife, "They can't know my Christian name here."
In the fifth issue of the comic American Virgin, a gravestone in the Glade of Eden Cemetery in Miami is marked Randolph Carter.
Randolph Carter is the protagonist in Charles Cutting's webcomic for The Illustrated Ape magazine.
In Alan Moore's The League of Extraordinary Gentlemen, Volume II, Randolph Carter is said to be the great-nephew of John Carter.
 In the Oct. 1979 issue of Heavy Metal, Randolph Carter appears in The Thing, a six-page picture version of The Statement of Randolph Carter using the original text.
 In I.N.J. Culbard's Lovecraft, in the story At The Mountains of Madness, the book A War Come Near written by Randolph Carter appears.

Parodies
Carter appears three times in the Lovecraft-themed musical parody A Shoggoth on the Roof, including in the opening number.
In the parody RPG Pokéthulhu, the main protagonist is a young boy named Randy Carter.

Games
In Chaosium's collectible card game MYTHOS and its MYTHOS: Dreamlands expansion, Randolph Carter appears as an ally card.
In Lovecraft Letter, a version of Love Letter including special insanity cards, he is the sane version of the "King" card of the original game.
Randolph Carter is the name of a dog in the Black Cyc game Cthulhu.
In Code Name: S.T.E.A.M., Randolph Carter is featured as a member of the S.T.E.A.M. strike force.
Randolph Carter appears in Fate/Grand Order as a non-playable character in the Salem chapter.
In Persona 2: Eternal Punishment'''s additional scenario (PSP Remake), Randolph Carter is a character who grants access to Kadath Mandala for the party, requesting that they retrieve the fragment of his soul stolen by Nyarlathotep.

Film
The character Randolph Carter is the protagonist in the 1988 film The Unnamable, loosely based on the short story; he reprised the role in the 1993 sequel, The Unnamable II: The Statement of Randolph Carter. Randolph Carter was played by Mark Kinsey Stephenson as an intellectual on a search for adventure, as he appeared in The Dream-Quest of Unknown Kadath and "The Silver Key", rather than "a bag of nerves" as he was described in "The Statement of Randolph Carter". 
Carter is the main character in the movie adaptation of "Cool Air", replacing the unnamed narrator of the original story.
The character Randolph Carter is the protagonist in the 2013 independent film HP Lovecraft: Two Left Arms.

Radio
 A radio adaptation of "The Statement of Randolph Carter" by Macabre Fantasy Radio Theater was performed live in 2012.
 Randolph Carter was played by Terry Edward Moore in the Imagination Theatre radio series Kincaid, the StrangeSeeker.

 Chronological appearances 
This list is based in the An H. P. Lovecraft Encyclopedia.
 The Dream-Quest of Unknown Kadath: here Carter is, presumably, twenty years old. This is the "first" of Carter's stories (See The Silver Key section).
 "The Statement of Randolph Carter": here Carter's age is unspecified, but the events are set after The Dream-Quest of Unknown Kadath.
 "The Unnamable": This story occurs shortly after The Statement of Randolph Carter.
 "The Silver Key": here Carter is thirty, but in the story he finds himself transformed into a nine-year-old boy. Then, at fifty-four, he finds the Silver Key. 
 "Through the Gates of the Silver Key": sequel to The Silver Key.An H. P. Lovecraft Encyclopedia doesn't mention anything about the chronology of "The Case of Charles Dexter Ward" or "Out of the Aeons". Lovecraft scholar S.T. Joshi used the chronology Lovecraft gives in "The Silver Key" in which the events in "The Statement of Randolph Carter" took place when Carter was in his late forties. Joshi says it would also explain why he was called a "bundle of nerves" in that story, since it took place after his World War I service in which he was nearly killed and might still have post-traumatic stress disorder.

 Real-life influences 

Lovecraft's character may have been based on a real-life Randolph Carter, who was a Scholar at Christ's College, in the University of Cambridge, from 1892-1895. Carter took his Part I Tripos in Oriental Studies (Arabic), and his Part II in Egyptology. While at Cambridge, he was an acquaintance of Sir James George Frazer, author of The Golden Bough. Carter's whereabouts after Cambridge are unclear, but, like his fictional namesake, he may have used the French Foreign Legion as a route into exploring the North African deserts. College records do not indicate whether Carter was a US or British citizen.

 References 

 H. P. Lovecraft, At the Mountains of Madness.
 H. P. Lovecraft, Dagon and Other Macabre Tales''.

External links
 

Characters in short stories
Fictional characters from Massachusetts
Literary characters introduced in 1919
Fictional writers
Male characters in literature
Cthulhu Mythos characters